Sweet Chalybeate Springs, also known as the Red Sweet Springs, Sweet Chalybeate Hotel and Sweet Chalybeate Springs Lodge, is a historic resort hotel complex located at Sweet Chalybeate, Alleghany County, Virginia. It dates to the 1850s, and consists of a main building, guest ranges, and cottages all fronted with two-level porches. There are a total of eight contributing buildings and one contributing structure.  The main building is a gable roof, weatherboarded, frame structure 12 bays long and 2 bays deep.  The resort developed around springs flowing undisturbed from the bottom of a small rock bluff.  Sweet Chalybeate suffered decline and finally closed its doors in 1918.

It was added to the National Register of Historic Places in 1974.

References

External links

 "Taking the Waters: 19th Century Mineral Springs: Red Sweet Springs." Claude Moore Health Sciences Library, University of Virginia
Sweet Chalybeate Springs, State Route 311, Sweet Chalybeate, Alleghany County, VA: 1 photo, 2 data pages, and 1 photo caption page at Historic American Buildings Survey
Sweet Chalybeate Springs, Main Building, State Route 311, Sweet Chalybeate, Alleghany County, VA: 3 photos and 1 photo caption page at Historic American Buildings Survey
Sweet Chalybeate Springs, North Guest Range & Cottages, State Route 311, Sweet Chalybeate, Alleghany County, VA: 1 photo and 1 photo caption page at Historic American Buildings Survey
Sweet Chalybeate Springs, Southern Guest Range, Sweet Chalybeate, Alleghany County, VA: 1 photo and 1 photo caption page at Historic American Buildings Survey
Sweet Chalybeate Springs, Bandstand, State Route 311, Sweet Chalybeate, Alleghany County, VA: 1 photo and 1 photo caption page at Historic American Buildings Survey
Sweet Chalybeate Springs, Spring House, State Route 311, Sweet Chalybeate, Alleghany County, VA: 1 photo and 1 photo caption page at Historic American Buildings Survey

Hotel buildings on the National Register of Historic Places in Virginia
Hotel buildings completed in 1850
Buildings and structures in Alleghany County, Virginia
National Register of Historic Places in Alleghany County, Virginia
Historic American Buildings Survey in Virginia